1924 Emperor's Cup Final was the 4th final of the Emperor's Cup competition. The final was played at Meiji Jingu Gaien Stadium in Tokyo on October 31, 1924. Rijo Shukyu-Dan won the championship.

Overview
Rijo Shukyu-Dan won their 1st title, by defeating All Mikage Shihan Club 4–1. Rijo Shukyu-Dan was featured a squad consisting of Shizuo Miyama, Naoemon Shimizu and Sachi Kagawa.

Match details

See also
1924 Emperor's Cup

References

Emperor's Cup
1924 in Japanese football